Kirby is an unincorporated community in Shelby County, in the U.S. state of Missouri.

History
A post office called Kirby was established in 1882, and remained in operation until 1906. The community bears the name of the local Kirby family.

References

Unincorporated communities in Shelby County, Missouri
Unincorporated communities in Missouri